Stober is a surname. Notable people with the surname include:

Cyril Stober, Nigerian journalist and newscaster
Gerald Stober (born 1969), South African footballer
Heidi Stober (born 1978), American operatic soprano

See also
Stoeber